Paradise in the Snow (German:Das Paradies im Schnee) is a 1923 German-Swiss silent film directed by Georg Jacoby and starring Bruno Kastner, Lona Schmidt and Ferry Sikla.

The film's art direction was by Ludwig Kainer.

Cast
Bruno Kastner as Edwin  
Lona Schmidt as Konstanza  
Ferry Sikla as Andersen 
Elga Brink as Mara Andersen  
Edith Meller as Daisy, Maras Freundin  
Hans Marr as Morris 
Georg Alexander as Bob

References

External links

Swiss silent films
Films of the Weimar Republic
German silent feature films
Films directed by Georg Jacoby
Skiing films
Films based on German novels
Films set in the Alps
German black-and-white films